Zacharias Adoni (born 13 June 1999) is a Cypriot football player who plays as a centre-back for Nea Salamina.

Club career
Adoni made his Cypriot First Division debut for Doxa Katokopia on 3 March 2018, in a game against Olympiakos Nicosia.

On 28 June 2021, Adoni joined Ethnikos Achna on a free transfer.

References

External links
 

1999 births
Living people
Cypriot footballers
Cyprus youth international footballers
Cyprus under-21 international footballers
Association football defenders
APOEL FC players
Doxa Katokopias FC players
ASIL Lysi players
Cypriot First Division players